Cebolla Wilderness is a  Wilderness area located within the El Malpais National Conservation Area in New Mexico. The area was added to the National Wilderness Preservation System on December 31, 1987 by Public Law 100-225. The  area is a bordered by the Acoma Pueblo to the east and the El Malpais National Monument and New Mexico Highway 117 to the west. The sandstone canyons and mesas of this rimrock area include features such as La Ventana natural arch.

References 

Wilderness areas of New Mexico
Protected areas of Cibola County, New Mexico